Re Endacott [1959] EWCA Civ 5 is an English trusts law case, concerning the policy of the "beneficiary principle". It held that outside of trusts for animals, graves and saying private masses (and hunting foxes, till the Hunting Act 2004) no trusts can be made for purposes that are non-charitable.

Facts
Mr Albert Endacott wrote in his will that he would give his son some houses and a factory, and then all the rest to the North Tawton Devon Parish Council ‘for the purpose of providing some useful memorial to myself’ unless his wife was still alive, in which case the interest should be paid to her.

Judgment
Lord Evershed MR held that the trust was invalid, because it would be a purpose trust going beyond the fixed list that had been previously exempt.

Significance
Re Endacott put an end to non-charitable purpose trusts developing in English law, and stated that only the four previously acknowledge categories held good. Hayton and Mitchell question whether even those categories are genuinely non-charitable purpose trusts. As they see it,

Re Dean (1889) 41 Ch D 552, a trust for the maintenance of stables and kennels of the testator's horses and hounds, should be viewed as a trust for the owner of the animals
Re Hooper [1932] 1 Ch 38, building and maintaining graves and funeral monuments, are actually valid, even if private under the Parish Councils and Burial Authorities (Miscellaneous Provisions) Act 1970 section 1
Bourne v Keane [1919] AC 815, trusts for the saying of private masses, are barely distinguishable from public masses. Only Re Hetherington [1990] Ch 1 divided the two, somewhat dubiously, because only if the prayer can be publicly be witnessed can it be for the public's benefit.
Re Thompson [1934] Ch 342, to promote fox hunting is no longer relevant given the Hunting Act 2004. Moreover, this was just wrong as a decision because Romer J ‘erroneously based his judgment on negative enforceability by the default beneficiary when positive enforceability is necessary.’

See also

English trusts law

Notes

References

English trusts case law
Court of Appeal (England and Wales) cases
1959 in British law
1959 in case law